Nina J. Karnovsky is an American ecologist and ornithologist. She is the Willard George Halstead Zoology Professor of Biology at Pomona College in Claremont, California.

Early life and education 
Karnovsky attended Wesleyan University. She loved the liberal arts and the philosophy of science offerings there but disliked science courses and petitioned out of her required ones. She ended up majoring in science and society. After college, she taught children at the Point Blue Bird Observatory, a field station at Point Reyes. She earned a master's degree at Montana State University, where she studied Antarctic birds, and a doctorate at the University of California, Irvine, where she studied Arctic birds.

Career 
Karnovsky sought to teach smaller classes where she could get to know her students better, and began teaching at Pomona College in 2004 as a terrestrial biologist.

References

External links
Faculty page at Pomona College
Karnovsky lab website

Year of birth missing (living people)
Living people
Pomona College faculty
American women biologists
American ornithologists
American ecologists
Women ecologists
21st-century American women